Alfarràs is a municipality in the comarca of the Segrià in Catalonia, Spain. It is situated on the right bank of the Noguera Ribagorçana river, and receives irrigation water from the Aragon and Catalonia canal. The town is served by the N-230 road between Balaguer and Binéfar (comarca of La Llitera, Aragon).

Demography

Note 
 Alfarràs became part of the Segrià in the comarcal revision of 1990: previously it formed part of the Noguera.

References

 Panareda Clopés, Josep Maria; Rios Calvet, Jaume; Rabella Vives, Josep Maria (1989). Guia de Catalunya, Barcelona: Caixa de Catalunya.  (Spanish).  (Catalan).

External links 
Official website
 Government data pages 

Municipalities in Segrià
Populated places in Segrià